Przemysław Kulig (born 8 October 1980 in Mrągowo) is a Polish football defender who played in the Ekstraklasa for  Górnik Łęczna and Cracovia.

References

External links
 

1980 births
Living people
MKS Cracovia (football) players
Górnik Łęczna players
Polish footballers
Association football defenders
Górnik Zabrze players
People from Mrągowo
Sportspeople from Warmian-Masurian Voivodeship